Wayne Thom (born December 13, 1933) is an international architectural photographer.

Early life 
Thom was born in Shanghai and grew up in Hong Kong before moving to Vancouver. He studied photography, first at Art Center College of Design, in Pasadena, California, and then at Brooks Institute in Santa Barbara, where he graduated in 1968.

Career 
Thom's career spans five decades documenting upward of 2,800 projects. He has worked with clients in North America and Asia, but based mainly in the Greater Los Angeles Area.
His clients include architects and developers such as I. M. Pei, A. Quincy Jones, Arthur Erickson, Bennie Gonzales, William Pereira, Bing Thom, John Portman, Gio Ponti, Kajima USA, NBBJ and SOM.

Achievements 
 Modern Masters Awards, Los Angeles Conservancy 2015 
 Fellow, American Society Of Photographers since 1980 
 Member, Board of Director USC Architectural Guild 1982–1986
 Recipient of Steuben Award by Kodak 1982
 Speaker, 88th International Exposition of Professional Photography 1979
 Speaker, 85th International Exposition of Professional Photography 1977
 Speaker, 82nd International Exposition of Professional Photography 1973
 Recipient of First Award, PPG Architectural Photographer Invitational, 1973
 Member, Advisory Board LA Tech. 1972
 Member, Board of Trustees Brooks Institute of Photography 1971–1975
 Recipient of the Professional Photographer West Aurora Award in 1971, 72, 73
 Recipient of Ernest H. Brook Achievement Award 1968
 Life member, Professional Photographer Of America

Exhibitions
 Matter, Light and Form: Architectural Photographs of Wayne Thom, 1968–2003, WUHO Gallery, Los Angeles, 2015

Publications

Articles

References

External links
 
 

Living people
Brooks Institute alumni
Architectural photographers
Artists from Shanghai
1933 births